Magnolia compressa is a species of flowering plant in the family Magnoliaceae, native to Yunnan, Taiwan, the Ryukyu Islands, and southwest Japan, and introduced to South Korea. A small tree when in cultivation, it is hardy only to USDA zone 10. It may be planted in containers and brought indoors in the winter.

References

compressa
Ornamental trees
Flora of South-Central China
Flora of Taiwan
Flora of the Ryukyu Islands
Flora of Japan
Plants described in 1872